Flower of Life may refer to:
 Flower of Life, a symbol of sacred geometry
 Flower of Life, a Japanese manga series